Ercole Lamia (died 1591) was a Roman Catholic prelate who served as Bishop of Alessano (1578–1591).

Biography
On 11 August 1578, Ercole Lamia was appointed during the papacy of Pope Gregory XIII as Bishop of Alessano. He served as Bishop of Alessano until his resignation in 1591.

See also 
Catholic Church in Italy

References

External links and additional sources
 (for Chronology of Bishops) 
 (for Chronology of Bishops) 

16th-century Italian Roman Catholic bishops
1591 deaths
Bishops appointed by Pope Gregory XIII